Petrosedum is a genus of the succulent plant family Crassulaceae.

References

Bibliography

 

Crassulaceae
Crassulaceae genera